Annette Van Zyl (born 25 September 1943 in Pretoria), also known by her married name as Annette du Plooy, is a South African former tennis player. She was ranked in the top ten female players during the mid 1960s, and in 1966 she won the French Open Mixed Doubles title  with Frew McMillan, defeating Ann Haydon-Jones and Clark Graebner in three sets.

Tennis career
In January 1965 she won the singles title at the Natal Championships in Durban. In April 1965 Van Zyl reached the final of the British Hard Court Championships at Bournemouth but was beaten in straight sets by Ann Haydon-Jones. In June of the same year she won the singles title at the grass court tournament in Cheltenham and later that month she was victorious at the London Grass Court Championship played at the Queen's Club, defeating Christine Truman in the final. In July she won the Welsh title also against Truman in the final. She reached the semifinal of the French Open singles in 1967, beating Billie Jean King in the quarterfinal before losing to Lesley Turner Bowrey. In July 1968 she won the singles title at the Swiss Open after defeating Julie Heldman in the final with the loss of just one game. In August she beat Judy Tegart in straight sets in the final of the singles event at the German Championships in Hamburg and also won the doubles and mixed doubles events. Van Zyl reached the final of the South African Championships singles event on three occasions, winning the title in 1963 and 1975 and ending as runner–up in 1965.

Between 1964 and 1976 Van Zyl played in 11 ties for the South African Federation Cup team and compiled a 12–7 win-los record.

According to A. Wallis Myers of  The Daily Telegraph and the Daily Mail, Van Zyl was ranked in the world top ten in 1965, 1966, and 1968, reaching a career high of World No. 6 in those rankings in 1965 and 1966.

Tournament finals

Singles 13 (11 titles – 2 runner-ups)

Doubles 7 (4 titles, 3 runner-ups)

Mixed doubles 1

Personal life
On 20 April 1968 Van Zyl married Jan du Plooy in Pretoria. She is currently head coach at Brooklyn Union Tennis Club.

References

External links
 
 

South African female tennis players
Living people
1943 births
Sportspeople from Pretoria
Afrikaner people
South African people of Dutch descent
Grand Slam (tennis) champions in mixed doubles
French Championships (tennis) champions